E-mount or E mount may refer to:

 Sony E-mount (part of α (Alpha), Handycam, NXCAM, XDCAM, Cyber-shot and SmartShot families), a fully electronic bayonet lens mount for mirrorless digital system cameras introduced by Sony in 2010
 Hasselblad E-mount, the same camera mount since 2013
 Carl Zeiss E-mount (ZA), lenses designed for E-mount cameras

See also 
 Mount E, Kameda, Oshima, Hakodate, Hokkaido, Japan; a stratovolcano
 EF-mount
 A-mount (disambiguation)
 E (disambiguation)

Lens mounts
 E-mount cameras
 E-mount lenses